Hamid Fawzi (born 1 July 1939) is a former Iraqi football goalkeeper who played for Iraq between 1965 and 1966. He was called up for the 1966 Arab Nations Cup.

References

Iraqi footballers
Iraq international footballers
Al-Shorta SC players
Living people
Association football goalkeepers
1939 births